Ringo 5.1: The Surround Sound Collection is a DVD-Audio compilation by Ringo Starr. The tracks featured are from his albums Ringo Rama and Choose Love. The album was nominated for a Grammy for Best Surround Sound.

Track listing

Disc: 1
"Fading in and Fading Out"
"Never Without You"
"Choose Love"
"Imagine Me There"
"Oh My Lord" – with Billy Preston
"Memphis in Your Mind"
"Give Me Back the Beat"
"Love First, Ask Questions Later"
"Don't Hang Up" – with Chrissie Hynde
"Eye to Eye"
"Some People"
"Elizabeth Reigns"

Disc: 2
All songs are featured in Dolby Digital, DTS and DVD-Audio (MLP) 5.1 surround sound mixes. The tracklist is slightly different from that given on the inlay cards ("Some People" comes before "Don't Hang Up"). The DVD has an extra track, "I Really Love Her", which was previously a hidden track on Ringo Rama.

"Fading in and Fading Out"
"Never Without You" – with Eric Clapton
"Choose Love"
"Imagine Me There" – with Charlie Haden
"Oh My Lord" – with Billy Preston
"Memphis in Your Mind" – with Timothy B. Schmit
"Give Me Back the Beat"
"Love First, Ask Questions Later"
"Some People"
"Don't Hang Up" – with Chrissie Hynde
"Eye to Eye"
"Elizabeth Reigns" – with Van Dyke Parks
"I Really Love Her" – performed completely by Ringo

References

2008 greatest hits albums
Ringo Starr compilation albums
Albums produced by Ringo Starr
Albums produced by Mark Hudson (musician)